A T-bar sandal or T-bar shoe (also known in the United Kingdom as "school sandal" or "closed-toe sandal") is a closed, low-cut shoe with two or more straps forming one or more T shapes (one or more straps across the instep passing through a perpendicular, central strap that extends from the vamp).

Classic T-bars for children are typically made of blue or brown leather, have two thin straps forming a single T shape and fastened with a buckle, a broad and rounded toe box pierced with a pattern of holes, a low heel, and a crêpe rubber outsole stitched-down to the upper. Among boys, T-bars are traditionally worn with socks (though it is possible without them as well), short trousers and a shirt.

History
First seen in Europe and America in the early 1900s, T-bars became very common among children in the 1950s, particularly among boys where they supplanted pre-war Mary Janes. T-bar wearing declined after the 1960s nonetheless, following the cultural and clothing revolution that swept the West.

Today, T-bars are more associated with girls, particularly the more classic styles and are often considered semi-formal shoes, appropriate for school (some primary schools in the United Kingdom require that pupils wear them with their uniform). They may also be viewed as formal shoes for children, suitable for religious ceremonies, weddings, visits, and birthday parties for example. 

More modern styles are worn in casual settings, however: playgrounds, shopping centres, etc. Although less popular than in the past, T-bars remain a timeless classic of children's fashion and, for many people, a symbol of childhood.

Gallery

See also 
Mary Jane (shoe)—a very similar style

References 

Children's clothing
Sandals
Shoes